Bang Eun-hee (born Bang Min-seo on May 7, 1967) is a South Korean actress. Bang made her acting debut in 1988, and rose to fame after being cast as the lead actress in Im Kwon-taek's General's Son (1990). She has starred in films and television dramas such as The Day a Pig Fell into the Well (1996), No. 3 (1997), 3PM Paradise Bath House (1997), Shadows of an Old Love (1998), Legend of Hyang Dan (2007), Daebak Life (2008), and All My Love (2010).

Bang married Kim Nam-hee, founder and CEO of NH Media, on September 9, 2010. As of 2016, she is now represented by the agency.

Filmography

Film

Television series

Radio program

Theater

Awards and nominations

References

External links 
 
 
 

1967 births
Living people
20th-century South Korean actresses
21st-century South Korean actresses
South Korean television actresses
South Korean film actresses
South Korean stage actresses
South Korean musical theatre actresses
Seoul Institute of the Arts alumni